North Bogor (or Bogor Kalér) is one of the six districts (kecamatan) within the Bogor, West Java, Indonesia. The district covers an area of 17.72 km2, and had a population of 197,011 at the 2022 Census.  Administratively it is divided into eight administrative village/Kelurahan.

Demography

References

Districts of West Java
Bogor